Eurotopia is the sixth and currently last studio album by Swedish singer-songwriter E-Type, which was released on 31 October 2007. It contains the hit songs "True Believer" and "Eurofighter".

The album is dominated by the vocals of Sanne Karlsson, the newest addition to the band. Album reached 10th peak place in Swedish albums charts, but soon fell off the charts becoming E-Type's least successful album. In Finland it flopped, despite the lead-off single "True Believer" smashing Finnish singles Chart reaching # 3. It was a # 1 hit in Sweden.

Track listing

Chart positions

References

External links

2007 albums
E-Type (musician) albums
Albums produced by Max Martin